The Honde Valley extends from the eastern border of Zimbabwe into Mozambique. The valley is part of the Eastern Highlands. The Nyanga Mountains and the Nyanga National Park forms the western boundary of the valley.

Access
Approaching from Mutare, the turn-off is about 50 km along the road towards Nyanga. The road into the valley is tarred and twists and turns steeply as it drops 800 meters in about 20 km. Off the tarred road, there are good dust roads which service most parts of the Valley.

Geography

Climate
The climate of Honde Valley falls is mostly temperate. From late October to around the end of April it is the summer months, the weather is hot and humid. Temperatures may rise up to 28 ˚C and this is the period where most of the rainfall is received. From May to the beginning of July winter season, the temperatures are very low and they may hover around minimums of 2 ˚C while From September to October during spring, it is hot with maximum temperatures averaging around 25 to 30 ˚C.
Most of the rainfall experienced is of the convectional type. At time orographic rainfalls at various times of the year, in addition to the normal convectional rainfall. This portion of the country, therefore, receives the highest rainfall in the country as it is located in Region 1 of the country's 5 regions with region 1 receiving the largest amount of rainfall. As the area is in the highlands, winters tend to be very cold but overall the region has a very pleasant climate.

Topography
The average altitude of Honde Valley is around 900m above sea-level as compared to its immediate surroundings which rise above 1800m. This abrupt drop in topography creates the spectacular Mtarazi and adjacent Muchururu Falls, local tourist attractions.

Flora
The 500 square kilometres of the Honde Valley in Zimbabwe are extensively cultivated, often with gravity fed irrigation channels. Extensive use is made of the many smaller tributaries feeding into the Pungwe River in this portion of the Honde Valley.

Fauna
Honde Valley is one of the premier birding destinations in Zimbabwe, offers a wide range of species difficult to find in most other parts of the region, other than in neighbouring Mozambique. This fertile valley lies 850m above sea level and is one of the major tea producing areas of Zimbabwe.

Specials: Anchieta's tchagra, moustached grass-warbler, red-winged warbler, black-winged bishop, red-faced crimsonwing, lesser seedcracker, singing cisticola, twinspot indigobird which parasitizes the red-throated twinspot, scarce swift, pallid honeyguide, green-backed woodpecker, stripe-cheeked greenbul, yellow-streaked greenbul, silvery-cheeked hornbill, white-eared barbet, pale batis, black-throated wattle-eye, variable sunbird, bronzy sunbird, olive sunbird, yellow-bellied waxbill, grey waxbill, blue-spotted wood-dove, black-fronted bush-shrike.

Habitats: Lowland and riverine forest, marsh, miombo woodland, tea estate, maize lands.

Birding: There are four main birding areas in the valley, the area around Aberfoyle Club; Gleneagles Nature Reserve above the Club, eastern Highland Tea Estate; and Katiyo Tea Estate some 25 km from Aberfoyle.

Water resources
The water supply for the Honde Valley comprises small piped systems and motorised pumps serving small towns, growth points, commercial plantations, service centres and some villages, as well as direct abstractions from the rivers by riparian village communities not connected to developed installations.

There are a total of about seven small to medium-sized metered piped water systems at Hauna, Sachisuko, Honde Army, Zindi, Samanga, Mpotedzi and Sahumani. In addition there are other smaller un-metered water supply schemes that serve a number of villages and schools. The known smaller un-metered water supply schemes are Honde “Povo” Pipe Scheme, Chingaira Piped Scheme, St Columbus Secondary School, Sagambe Primary and Secondary School, Marige Water Project, Mahobo Piped Scheme and Mupenga Gravity Water Scheme.

Economy
Since the area is low-lying and hot it is an abundant tea and coffee growing area. The well known Katiyo, Aberfoyle, Rumbizi and Chiwira Tea Estates are among those situated in the valley. However, it is also home to many small scale and subsistence farmers. There are several non-motorized irrigation schemes in Honde valley.

One of the main townships inside the valley is Hauna. Hauna Growth Point now has a community Hospital.

Electricity generation 

Electricity generating projects have so far been put in place which are supplying ZESA namely the Nyamhingura, Duru, Pungwe A,B & C and Hauna Power Stations. All plants are managed by Nyangani Renewable Energy (Pvt) Ltd, with an installed capacity of 27 MW; Annual average output of 80,000 Mwh.

Tea estates

 Eastern Highlands Tea Estate

Business centers 
 Hauna Growth point – Hauna Growth point is located in the Honde Valley communal land about 95 km north of Mutare. It is the Growth Point Centre for Mutasa District in Manicaland. There is an aerodrome where small aeroplanes can land and take off. There is also a Police camp called Ruda Police Station which controls all police activities in that part of Mutasa District. There is also Hauna Hospital. It can be reached by a tarred road from Mutare and cellphone coverage is also available on the net-one, telecel and econet networks.
 Zindi Business centre

Education
Honde Valley has a number of schools and tertiary institutions.

Secondary schools

 Sagambe High School
 Chavhanga Secondary School
 Chisuko Secondary School
 Muterere High School
 St Columbus High School
 Munyuku Secondary School
 Nyamhingura Secondary
 Ngarura Secondary School
 Gatsi High School
 Rupinda Secondary School
 St Peters Mandeya Secondary School
 Sahumani Secondary School
 Samaringa High School
 Muparutsa Secondary School
 St Peters Jombe Secondary School

Tertiary institutions
 Honde Mission Technical Training College
 Dzidzai Technical College

Hospitals and clinics

 Hauna District Hospital
 Chisuko Clinic
 Sagambe Clinic
 Katiyo Tea Estate Clinic
 Chavhanga Clinic
 St Peter's Mandeya Clinic
 Gatsi Clinic
 Sahumani Clinic
 Chitombo Clinic
 Honde Green / Mpotedzi Clinic
 Samaringa Clinic
 Jombe Clinic
 Samanga Clinic
 Ngarura Clinic
 Rupinda Clinic
 Hauna Clinic
 Honde Mission Clinic
 Samanga Clinic
 Kwambana Clinic
 Zindi Clinic

Entertainment and recreation

Social clubs
 Limpopo Restaurant and Bar

Tourist attractions
Honde Valley has loads of tourism potential. The area's natural beauty and cool climate are coupled with lush forests. tea estate tours at Aberfoyle and water activities in local dams, white water rafting, the Mtarazi Falls and scenic drives make this area ideal for nature tourists. the Skywalk is one of the most renowned activities that is offered by Far and Wide Zimbabwe. some people also go there for dirt bike racing. mostly in December, the area will be buzzing with local and some international tourists.

 Mahwemasimike – a range of mountains which are beautiful to watch for tourists can be seen apart from the Hauna Growth Point.
 Mtarazi Falls - The longest falls in Zimbabwe coming from Nyanga which falls into the Honde River.
 Pungwe River – fishing and white water rafting
 Nyanga National Park
 Honde River
 Nyawamba Dam- fishing
 Chipote (Kapunga) Falls
 Honde View – a good view of attractive fauna

See also

 Geography of Zimbabwe

References

Eastern Highlands
Eastern Zimbabwe montane forest-grassland mosaic
Geography of Manicaland Province
Landforms of Zimbabwe
Mutasa District
Valleys of Africa